Jan Sochor (born January 17, 1980) is a Czech former professional ice hockey forward.

Sochor played 194 games in the Czech Extraliga for HC Slavia Praha and HC Vsetín between 1997 and 2004. He also played in the GET-ligaen for Lillehammer IK and Stjernen Hockey and in the Slovak Extraliga for HKM Zvolen.

Sochor was drafted 161st overall by the Toronto Maple Leafs in the 1999 NHL Entry Draft but he never played in the NHL.

References

External links

1980 births
Living people
Czech ice hockey forwards
Fresno Falcons players
HC Dukla Jihlava players
HC Kobra Praha players
HC Slavia Praha players
HC Slovan Ústečtí Lvi players
HKM Zvolen players
IK Comet players
LHK Jestřábi Prostějov players
Lillehammer IK players
Oklahoma City Blazers (1992–2009) players
Sportovní Klub Kadaň players
Sportspeople from Ústí nad Labem
Stjernen Hockey players
Toronto Maple Leafs draft picks
Victoria Salmon Kings players
VHK Vsetín players
Czech expatriate ice hockey players in Finland
Czech expatriate ice hockey players in Canada
Czech expatriate ice hockey players in Slovakia
Czech expatriate ice hockey players in the United States
Czech expatriate sportspeople in Norway
Expatriate ice hockey players in Norway